Sviatlana Aliaksandrauna Pirazhenka (born 12 September 1992) is an inactive Belarusian tennis player.

Pirazhenka has won four singles and 20 doubles titles on the ITF Women's Circuit. On 18 August 2014, she reached a career-high singles ranking of world No. 371. On 7 July 2014, she peaked at No. 253 in the WTA doubles rankings.

Pirazhenka made her WTA Tour debut at the 2014 Gastein Ladies, partnering Irina Falconi in doubles. The pair lost their first-round match against Kateryna Bondarenko and Nicole Melichar in three sets.

ITF finals

Singles: 8 (4 titles, 4 runner-ups)

Doubles: 46 (20 titles, 26 runner-ups)

References

External links
 
 

1992 births
Living people
Belarusian female tennis players
Universiade medalists in tennis
Universiade silver medalists for Belarus
Medalists at the 2011 Summer Universiade
21st-century Belarusian women